Albert Sybrandus "Ab" Ekels (5 December 1950, Hilversum) is a sailor from the Netherlands, who represented his country at the 1976 Summer Olympics in Kingston, Canada. With helmsman Ben Staartjes Ekels took the 8th place in the Tempest. Ekels later specialized in the Star and Dragon together with fellow crew members Harald de Vlaming and helmsman Pieter Keijzer.

Ab Ekels was head of the Dutch Olympic Sailing Team for the 2012 Summer Olympics.

Sources

External links
 
 
 

1950 births
Living people
Dutch male sailors (sport)
Dragon class sailors
Star class sailors
Olympic sailors of the Netherlands
Sailors at the 1976 Summer Olympics – Tempest
Sportspeople from Hilversum